Jeffrey Barker (16 October 1915 in Scunthorpe, England – 1985 in Scunthorpe) was a professional footballer.

He started his career at Goole Town, before joining Scunthorpe and Lindsey United in 1935. After a year in the Midland League, his exceptional skills got him signed up by Aston Villa for a fee of £400 in November 1936.

He remained at Villa for ten years but only managed three league appearances, before his career was interrupted by World War II. He continued to play for Villa in the wartime leagues, making six appearances and also guested for Blackpool, Rochdale, Walsall, Watford and Huddersfield Town. In August 1942, he made a single guest appearance for Dundee United in Scotland.

After the war, he joined Huddersfield Town in November 1945, where he made 67 appearances before returning to Scunthorpe United in August 1948.

In 1974, he was in charge of "the Iron" for three games while a new manager was being approached.

He died in 1985 in Scunthorpe.

His son John also played for Scunthorpe United.

References

External links
Aston Villa career details

1915 births
1985 deaths
Sportspeople from Scunthorpe
Association football fullbacks
English footballers
Scunthorpe United F.C. players
Aston Villa F.C. players
Huddersfield Town A.F.C. players
Huddersfield Town A.F.C. wartime guest players
Watford F.C. wartime guest players
Scunthorpe United F.C. managers
Dundee United F.C. wartime guest players
English football managers